RAF Pucklechurch was a Royal Air Force site in Pucklechurch, Gloucestershire from 9 August 1939 until 31 December 1959. It became known as RAF Pucklechurch on 16 June 1952. It was transferred to HM Prison Service in September 1962 and became Pucklechurch Remand Centre.

History
During the war barrage balloons were an important defence to the industry and transport sites in the Bristol region. There were large hangars and fuel storage facilities. Pucklechurch was under the command of the RAF Filton station commander.

From April 1957 to September 1959 it housed the Joint Services School for Applied Linguistics and the RAF Chinese Language School.

Operational commands
Opened - 9 August 1939 (as No. 11 Balloon Centre)
RAF Balloon Command (9 August 1939 – 22 April 1945)
RAF Maintenance Command (22 April 1945 – 25 February 1947)
No. 62 Group RAF (25 February 1947 – 14 January 1957)
No. 61 Group RAF (14 January 1957 – 31 December 1959)
Closed - 31 December 1959

Current use
Since September 1962 it became Pucklechurch Remand Centre and later Ashfield Young Offender Institution.

See also
List of former Royal Air Force stations

References

Citations

External links
A short history of No.11 Balloon Centre at Pucklechurch, 1939 to 1945, and RAF Station Pucklechurch, 1945 to 1959 by John Penny

Royal Air Force stations in Gloucestershire